Ashkenazi Hebrew is the pronunciation system for Biblical and Mishnaic Hebrew favored for Jewish liturgical use and Torah study by Ashkenazi Jewish practice.

Features
As it is used parallel with modern Hebrew, its phonological differences are clearly recognized:
(Compare Yisroeil (Lithuanian) or Yisruayl (Polish-Galician) vs. Yisra'el (Israeli).) An earlier pronunciation of ‘ayin as a velar nasal is attested most prominently in Dutch Hebrew (and historically also the Hebrew of Frankfurt am Main). Vestiges of this earlier pronunciation are still found throughout the Yiddish-speaking world in names like Yankev (יעקבֿ) and words like manse (מעשׂה, more commonly pronounced mayse), but are otherwise marginal.
  raphated  is pronounced  in Ashkenazi Hebrew. It is always pronounced  in modern and Sephardi Hebrew. (Compare Shabbos vs. Shabbat, or Es vs. Et.)
    is pronounced  (or ) in Ashkenazi Hebrew, where it would be pronounced  in Sephardi Hebrew; modern Hebrew varies between the two pronunciations. (Compare Omein (Lithuanian) or Umayn (Polish-Galician) vs. Amayn (Israeli Hebrew).)
(Compare Dovid (Lithuanian) or Duvid (Polish-Galician) vs. David .)
(Compare Moishe vs. Moshe.)
 Unstressed  qubbuṣ or  shuruq  occasionally becomes  in Ashkenazi Hebrew (This is more prevalent in the South-Eastern dialects as the North-Eastern dialects did not make reforms to this vowel), when in all other forms they are pronounced  (Kíddush vs. kiddúsh.) In the Hungarian and Oberlander dialects, the pronunciation is invariably .
 There is some confusion (in both directions) between final  tzere  and  hiriq  (Tishrei vs. Tishri; Sifri vs. Sifre.)

Variants

There are considerable differences between the Lithuanian, Polish (also known as Galician), Hungarian, and German pronunciations.
Other variants exist: for example in the United Kingdom, the original tradition was to use the German pronunciation, but over the years the sound of ḥolam has tended to merge with the local pronunciation of long "o" as in "toe", and some communities have abandoned Ashkenazi Hebrew altogether in favour of the Israeli pronunciation. (Haredi communities in England usually use the Galician/Polish .)
Tzere is pronounced  in the majority of Ashkenazic traditions. In Polish usage, however, it was not infrequently .
Segol is pronounced  in the majority of Ashkenazic traditions, but  in Southeastern pronunciations (Polish, Galician, etc.).
This is similar to the pronunciation of the Ephraimites recorded in Judges 12, which is the source of the term Shibboleth.
The pronunciation of resh varies between an alveolar flap or trill (as in Spanish) and a voiced uvular fricative or trill (as in French, see Guttural R), depending on variations in the local dialects of German and Yiddish.

In addition to geographical differences, there are differences in register between the "natural" pronunciation in general use and the more prescriptive rules advocated by some rabbis and grammarians, particularly for use in reading the Torah. For example:

 In earlier centuries the stress in Ashkenazi Hebrew usually fell on the penultimate, instead of the last syllable as in most other dialects. In the 17th and 18th centuries there was a campaign by Ashkenazi rabbis such as Jacob Emden and the Vilna Gaon to encourage final stress in accordance with the stress marks printed in the Bible. This was successful as concerned liturgical use such as reading from the Torah. However, the older stress pattern persists in the pronunciation of Hebrew words in Yiddish and in early modern poetry by Hayim Nahman Bialik and Shaul Tchernichovsky.
 Many authorities, from the Talmudic period on (b. Megillah 24b, y. Berakhot 2:4, b. Similarly, strict usage requires the articulation of initial  as a glottal stop.
 In general use, the mobile sheva is often omitted (for example the word for "time" is pronounced zman rather than zĕman). However, in liturgical use strict conformity to the grammatical rules is encouraged.

History
There are several theories on the origins of the different Hebrew reading traditions. The basic division is between those who believe that the differences arose in medieval Europe and those who believe that they reflect older differences between the pronunciations of Hebrew and Aramaic current in different parts of the Fertile Crescent, that is to say Judaea, Galilee, Syria, northern Mesopotamia and Babylonia proper. Within the first group of theories, Zimmels believed that the Ashkenazi pronunciation arose in late medieval Europe and that the pronunciation prevailing in France and Germany in the time of the Tosafists was similar to the Sephardic. His evidence for this was the fact that Asher ben Jehiel, a German who became chief rabbi of Toledo, never refers to any difference of pronunciation, though he is normally very sensitive to differences between the two communities.

The difficulty with the latter grouping of theories is that we do not know for certain what the pronunciations of these countries actually were and how far they differed. Since the expulsion of the Jews from Spain in 1492 (or before) the Sephardic pronunciation of the vowels became standard in all these countries, ironing out any differences that previously existed. This makes it harder to adjudicate between the different theories on the relationship between today's pronunciation systems and those of ancient times.

Leopold Zunz believed that the Ashkenazi pronunciation was derived from that of the Hebrew spoken in the Land of Israel in Geonic times (7th–11th centuries CE), while the Sephardi pronunciation was derived from that of Babylonia. This theory was supported by the fact that, in some respects, Ashkenazi Hebrew resembles the western dialect of Syriac while Sephardi Hebrew resembles the eastern, e.g. Eastern Syriac Peshitta as against Western Syriac Peshito. Ashkenazi Hebrew in its written form also resembles Palestinian Hebrew in its tendency to male spellings (see Mater lectionis).

Others, including Abraham Zevi Idelsohn, believed that the distinction is more ancient, and represents the distinction between the Judaean and Galilean dialects of Hebrew in Mishnaic times (1st−2nd centuries CE), with the Sephardi pronunciation being derived from Judaean and the Ashkenazi from Galilean. This theory is supported by the fact that Ashkenazi Hebrew, like Samaritan Hebrew, has lost the distinct sounds of many of the guttural letters, while there are references in the Talmud to this as a feature of Galilean speech. Idelsohn ascribes the Ashkenazi (and, on his theory, Galilean) pronunciation of kamatz gadol as [o] to the influence of Phoenician: see Canaanite shift.

In the time of the Masoretes (8th−10th centuries CE) there were three distinct notations for denoting vowels and other details of pronunciation in Biblical and liturgical texts. One was the Babylonian; another was the Palestinian; the third was the Tiberian, which eventually superseded the other two and is still in use today.

In certain respects the Ashkenazi pronunciation provides a better fit to the Tiberian notation than do the other reading traditions: for example, it distinguishes between pataḥ and qamaṣ gadol, and between segol and șere, and does not make the qamaṣ symbol do duty for two different sounds. A distinctive variant of the Tiberian notation was in fact used by Ashkenazim, before being superseded by the standard version. On the other hand, it is unlikely that in the Tiberian system ṣere and ḥolam were diphthongs as they are in Ashkenazi Hebrew: they are more likely to have been closed vowels. (On the other hand, these vowels sometimes correspond to diphthongs in Arabic.) For more details of the reconstructed pronunciation underlying the Tiberian notation, see Tiberian vocalization.

The 14th century work, Sefer Asufot is one of the only non-liturgical and non-Biblical medieval Ashkenazi texts to use nekuddot. Owing to its more day to day vocabulary, linguists have been able to conclude that medieval Ashkenazi Hebrew was much akin to its contemporary Sephardic vocalization.

In other respects Ashkenazi Hebrew resembles Yemenite Hebrew, which appears to be related to the Babylonian notation. These features are not found in the Hebrew pronunciation of today's Iraqi Jews, which as explained has been overlaid by Sephardi Hebrew, but are found in some of the Judeo-Aramaic languages of northern Iraq and in some dialects of Syriac.

Another possibility is that these features were found within an isogloss that included Syria, northern Palestine and northern Mesopotamia but not Judaea or Babylonia proper, and did not coincide exactly with the use of any one notation (and the ḥolam =  shift may have applied to a more restricted area than the qamaṣ gadol =  shift). The Yemenite pronunciation would, on this hypothesis, be derived from that of northern Mesopotamia and the Ashkenazi pronunciation from that of northern Palestine. The Sephardic pronunciation appears to be derived from that of Judaea, as evidenced by its fit to the Palestinian notation.

According to the Maharal of Prague and many other scholars, including Rabbi Yaakov Emden, one of the leading Hebrew grammarians of all time, Ashkenazi Hebrew is the most accurate pronunciation of Hebrew preserved. The reason given is that it preserves distinctions, such as between pataḥ and qamaṣ, which are not reflected in the Sephardic and other dialects. Only in the Ashkenazi pronunciation are all seven "nequdot" (the Hebrew vowels of the ancient Tiberian tradition) distinguished: Yemenite, which comes close, does not distinguish pataḥ from segol.

On the other hand, this view does not appear to be supported by any non-Ashkenazi scholars. Some scholars argue in favour of the greater authenticity of the Yemenite pronunciation on the ground that it is the only Hebrew pronunciation to distinguish all the consonants.

Influence on Modern Hebrew

Although modern Hebrew was intended to be based on Mishnaic spelling and Sephardi Hebrew pronunciation, the language as spoken in Israel has adapted to the popular (as opposed to the strict liturgical) Ashkenazi Hebrew phonology in the following respects:

the pronunciation of tzere as [eɪ] in some contexts, (sifrey and teysha instead of Sephardic sifré and tésha''' ) for some speakers.
the elimination of vocal sheva (zman instead of Sephardic zĕman)
some of the letter names (yud and kuf instead of Sephardic yod and qof/kof)
in popular speech, penultimate stress in some proper names (Dvóra instead of Dĕvorá; Yehúda instead of Yehudá) for some speakers.
similarly, penultimate stress in nouns or verbs with a second- or third-person plural suffix (katávtem [you wrote] instead of kĕtavtém; shalom aléykhem [greeting] instead of shalom alekhém).

Endnotes

See also
Sephardi Hebrew
Yemenite Hebrew
Phonology of modern Hebrew

Literature
 Ilan Eldar, Masoret ha-qeri'ah ha-kedem-Ashkenazit (The Hebrew Language Tradition in Medieval Ashkenaz), Edah ve-Lashon series vols. 4 and 5, Jerusalem (Hebrew)
 A. Z. Idelsohn, Die gegenwärtige Aussprache des Hebräischen bei Juden und Samaritanern, in: Monatsschrift für Geschichte und Wissenschaft des Judentums 57 (N.F.: 21), 1913, p. 527–645 and 698–721.
 Dovid Katz, The Phonology of Ashkenazic, in: Lewis Glinert (ed.), Hebrew in Ashkenaz. A Language in Exile, Oxford-New York 1993, p. 46–87. .
S. Morag, Pronunciations of Hebrew, Encyclopaedia Judaica XIII, p. 1120–1145.
 
 Miryam Segal, "Representing a Nation in Sound. Organic, Hybrid, and Synthetic Hebrew," in: A New Sound in Hebrew Poetry. Poetics, Politics, Accent," Bloomington, 2010. .
 Werner Weinberg, Lexikon zum religiösen Wortschatz und Brauchtum der deutschen Juden, ed. by Walter Röll, Stuttgart–Bad Cannstatt 1994. .
 Zimmels, Ashkenazim and Sephardim: their Relations, Differences, and Problems As Reflected in the Rabbinical Responsa'' : London 1958 (since reprinted). .

Hebrew
Hebrew
Hebrew words and phrases